is a railway station on the Ban'etsu West Line in the city of Kōriyama, Fukushima Prefecture, Japan, operated by East Japan Railway Company (JR East).

Lines

Station layout
Nakayamajuku Station has one side platform serving a single bi-directional track. There is no station building, but only a small shelter on the platform. The station is unattended. There was a switchback at this station before 1997. Since then the station platform was relocated and the switchback was demolished due to tunnel construction.

History
Nakayamajuku Station opened on July 26, 1898 as a provisional stop, and was officially made a station on March 10, 1899.  The station was absorbed into the JR East network upon the privatization of the Japanese National Railways (JNR) on April 1, 1987.

Surrounding area

See also
 List of Railway Stations in Japan

References

External links

 

Stations of East Japan Railway Company
Railway stations in Fukushima Prefecture
Ban'etsu West Line
Railway stations in Japan opened in 1899
Kōriyama